Mike Gravier (born September 27, 1960) is an American football coach and former player. He is the head football coach at Hug High School in Reno, Nevada, a position he had held since 2019. Gravier served as the head football coach at Malone College—now known as Malone University—in Canton, Ohio, from 1995 to 1998 and at Bluefield College in Bluefield, Virginia, in 2012. He was also the interim head football coach at Valparaiso University in Valparaiso, Indiana, for the final game of the 2013 season.

Gravier played college football at Grand Valley State University. At Malone, he led the Malone Pioneers football to significant victories early in the history of the program and an NAIA Division II playoff appearance in the program's third year.

Coaching career

Malone
Gravier was the second head football coach at Malone College—now known as Malone University—in Canton, Ohio, serving for four seasons, from 1995 to 1998, and compiling a record of  His career coaching record at Malone was 30–12–1.  This ranks him first at Malone in total wins and first at Malone in winning percentage.

Gravier's success at Malone is supported by his first-year record of 10 wins, 1 loss, and 1 tie and included a victory over rival Geneva College. The sole loss came in the quarterfinal playoffs for the NAIA national championships.  His team also reached the national championship hunt during his last season at Malone, losing to Georgetown College.  Three of the four years he coached at Malone, his team was either league champion or co-champion.  In spite of his success on the field, he was asked to resign by the administration a week before the season opening game of 1999 after allegations surfaced that he struck a student athlete during a practice session.

Assistant coaching
Prior to coaching at Malone, he was an assistant coach for the Michigan Tech Huskies and at Southeast Missouri State  He also was an assistant at Malone under head coach Joe Palmisano, whom he replaced to be the head coach.  He also worked as the tight ends coach at Concord University in Athens, West Virginia.

Bluefield College
Gravier was the head coach for the Bluefield College Rams in Bluefield, Virginia. The program participated in non-sanctioned "club play" for the 2011 season and joined the NAIA's Mid-South Conference beginning in the 2012 football season.

In their first season since 1941, the Bluefield Rams finished without a single win. Their record was 0–11 overall, recording 0–6 in conference play.  In April 2013 during spring drills, he was fired by the school.

Valparaiso
Gravier became an assistant coach of the Valparaiso Crusaders for the 2013 season. When the head coach was fired with one game to go in the season, he was promoted to interim head coach for the final game.  Valparaiso lost their final game that season.

At the end of the season, Dave Cecchini was hired as a full-time replacement  and Gravier was fired shortly thereafter.

Subsequent coaching jobs
During the 2014 season, Gravier served as an assistant coach at Eastern Michigan. After leaving the Eagles, he was out of college football. In 2017, he became the offensive line coach and associate coach at North Park  In 2019, Gravier was hired as the head football coach at Hug High School in Reno, Nevada.

Head coaching record

College

Notes

References

External links
 North Park profile
 Valparaiso profile

Living people
1960 births
Bluefield Rams football coaches
Concord Mountain Lions football coaches
Grand Valley State Lakers football players
Kalamazoo Hornets football coaches
Malone Pioneers football coaches
Michigan Tech Huskies football coaches
North Park Vikings football coaches
Southeast Missouri State Redhawks football coaches
Western Michigan Broncos football coaches
Valparaiso Beacons football coaches
High school football coaches in Nevada
Western Michigan University alumni